Adam Richards (born November 26, 1980) is an American former professional boxer who competed from 2001 to 2010, challenging for the WBO cruiserweight title in 2010. Richards was national amateur champion four times. He co-holds with Mike Tyson the record of winning two consecutive Junior Olympic heavyweight titles by knocking out every opponent.

Amateur career
Richards amassed an amateur record of 72-7 (41 KOs).

Highlights
Silver Gloves national champion x2
Golden Gloves champion
Junior Olympic super heavyweight champion
Junior world super heavyweight champion
2000 Olympic trials quarterfinalist

Professional career
Richards won his first two pro fights, but suffered a loss in his third fight. He then had a winning streak of 19 wins, with wins over Willie Palms, Billy Willis, Maurice Wheeler and Charles Davis.

Coming from his 19-fight winning streak, in November 2008 he fought heavyweight prospect Chazz Witherspoon in Nashville in a thrilling fight that ended with Richards' defeat via TKO in the eighth round.

In 2010 he faced Marco Huck for the WBO cruiserweight title. Richards was stopped by Huck in the third round of a lively fight. In the fight, Richards suffered a cut in the back of the head. The referee made a strange decision of calling Richards' first fall, after being pushed by Huck, a knockdown. Richards later criticized Huck due to reported elbows he suffered through the fight.

Professional boxing record

Television viewership

References

External links
 

1980 births
Living people
Boxers from Tennessee
Cruiserweight boxers
Heavyweight boxers
National Golden Gloves champions
American male boxers
People from Smyrna, Tennessee